Al Rogers (July 24, 1924 – December 6, 2019) was an American country singer.

Early life
Rogers was born July 24, 1924, in West Mifflin, Pennsylvania.  He learned to play the banjo at age 9 and the guitar at age 12.

Career
Rogers was the leader of the band "The Rocky Mountain Boys".  They are best known for their 1954 hit "Hydrogen Bomb", which was featured in the soundtrack of the movie "The Atomic Cafe". Rogers' fans know him as "The American Folk Balladeer".  In the 1950s, Rogers was a popular radio and television star in Amarillo, Texas, most notably in the TV series "The Panhandle Barn Dance".

Personal life and death
Rogers served in the United States Air Force during World War II, in the Pacific Theater. He married Betty Ross on May 20, 1947. In 1950 the couple moved to Amarillo, Texas. They had two daughters, Joanne (born 1952 and Kathy Denise (born 1957).

Rogers died on December 6, 2019, at the age of 95.

Honors and awards
In 1984, Al Rogers was inducted into the Country Music Hall of Fame Walkway of Stars.

References

1924 births
2019 deaths
People from West Mifflin, Pennsylvania
American country singer-songwriters
Musicians from Amarillo, Texas
Singer-songwriters from Texas
Singer-songwriters from Pennsylvania
Country musicians from Texas
Country musicians from Pennsylvania
United States Army Air Forces personnel of World War II